Horia Toboc (born 7 February 1955) is a Romanian sprinter. He competed in the men's 400 metres at the 1980 Summer Olympics.

References

1955 births
Living people
Athletes (track and field) at the 1980 Summer Olympics
Romanian male sprinters
Romanian male hurdlers
Olympic athletes of Romania
Place of birth missing (living people)